The men's hammer throw event at the 2002 Commonwealth Games was held on 28 July.

Results

References
Official results
Results at BBC

Hammer
2002